Zachełmie  is a village in the administrative district of Gmina Podgórzyn, within Jelenia Góra County, Lower Silesian Voivodeship, in south-western Poland.

Gallery

References

Villages in Karkonosze County